Dimitrios Pandermalis (1940 – 14 September 2022) was a Greek archaeologist. He was professor of archaeology at the Aristotle University of Thessaloniki, supervisor of the Archaeological site of Dion, Pieria and curator of the new Acropolis Museum.

His death was announced on 14 September 2022, at the age of 82.

References

External links 
 Pandermalis announces 2007 Acropolis Museum opening, Wikinews. 23 March 2006.

1940 births
2022 deaths
Greek archaeologists
Aristotle University of Thessaloniki alumni
Academic staff of the Aristotle University of Thessaloniki
Officers Crosses of the Order of Merit of the Federal Republic of Germany
People from Thessaloniki
20th-century archaeologists
21st-century archaeologists